Glyaden-4 is a rural locality (a selo) in Blagoveshchensky District, Altai Krai, Russia. The population was 149 as of 2013. There is 1 street.

Geography 
Glyaden-4 is located 43 km southeast of Blagoveshchenka (the district's administrative centre) by road. Glyaden is the nearest rural locality.

References 

Rural localities in Blagoveshchensky District, Altai Krai